Penwortham is a town in South Ribble, Lancashire, England, on the south bank of the River Ribble facing the city of Preston. The town is at the most westerly crossing point of the river, with major road and rail links crossing it here. The population of the town at the 2011 census was 23,047.

History
The distinctive town name is derived from Celtic and Anglo Saxon origins, pen (meaning a hill or head), wort (meaning green) and ham (meaning settlement) with earlier names of Peneverdant and Pendrecham in 1200; Penwrtham in 1204; Penuertham in 1212; Penwortham 1260 and Penewrthamn in 1292.

The town's history can be traced to pre-historic times with archaeological evidence showing that the ford at Middleforth was used to cross the Ribble. Penwortham was listed in the Domesday Book as "Penverdent". At the Norman conquest in 1066 the Barony was held by King Edward. In the 12th century Penwortham was the head of a barony held by Warine Bussel which included a large part of Leyland Hundred and manors in West Derby and Amounderness. Penwortham Castle, a motte-and-bailey castle was built during the post-Norman conquest period overlooking the Ribble and its ford by Roger of Poitou and served to guard the estuary and a ford crossing it. After Roger built Lancaster Castle, Penwortham declined in importance. Some evidence of this castle is still evident in St Mary's Churchyard but only the mound remains. In later centuries a manor house was built, but no evidence remains.

The barony was acquired by Roger de Lacy in 1205, and descended as part of the Honour of Clitheroe to the Earls and Dukes of Lancaster and the Crown. In the 16th century there were disputes about suit and service due to the court of Penwortham from the members of the fee. Charles I sold the royal manor to Edward Ditchfield and others in 1628 and it later passed to the Faringtons of Worden in Leyland. Courts were held until the late 19th century. Court rolls and books are kept at Worden Hall. Penwortham Priory was built in the west of the town.

Higher Penwortham has an old legend linked to it. The Fairy Funeral seen on the road through Penwortham Wood, was thought to forecast death.

Penwortham Hall, formerly called "The Lodge", was built in 1801 by John Horrocks, founder of the Preston cotton-manufacturing industry. It was sold by his son Peter to William Marshall, whose son Frederick died in 1889. It was left by Frederick to his sister, the wife of Rev. T. Ross Finch. The property, which is a Grade II listed building, is today used as a series of private dwellings.

The parish was part of Preston Rural District throughout its existence from 1894 to 1974. In 1974 the parish became part of the Borough of South Ribble.

Demography
Penwortham is one of the largest civil parishes by population in Lancashire, with a population of 23,436 recorded in the 2001 census. The town's development closely resembles that of Preston.

Geography
The Lower Penwortham area developed during the Victorian period which is evidenced by the large number of terrace housing along Leyland Road and the surrounding streets. Higher Penwortham is characterised by its 1920s and onwards, post-war semi-detached housing. The town includes the localities of Howick Cross and Middleforth, and the Kingsfold housing estate.

In recent times there have been several new housing developments, especially around the Broad Oak Farm, Bee Lane, Kingsfold Drive, Stricklands Lane and Factory Lane areas of the town.

Landmarks

Penwortham Priory was built for the Rawsthorne family and redesigned by the Cumbrian architect George Webster. The priory was demolished due to the rapid expansion of the area and the need for new housing. Penwortham Church Lodge was originally situated on Penwortham Hill towards Preston, but as a consequence of widening the A59 road the lodge was taken down and removed to a residential road in Hutton. Penwortham Water Tower was built in the late 19th century and has been converted to a dwelling. It is part of a development of semi-detached cottages built for employees of the local squire, Lawrence Rawstorne.

The original attempt to build a bridge over the River Ribble to Preston was completed in 1755, only to collapse the following year. The Penwortham Old Bridge opened in 1759 to replace it and still stands today, although it is no longer accessible to motorised traffic.

Education
As well as a number of primary schools, the three high schools in Penwortham are All Hallows Catholic High School, Penwortham Girls' High School and Penwortham Priory Academy. All are situated in close proximity to Liverpool Road, in the centre of the town.

Public services and amenities

Penwortham has three supermarkets, a Sainsbury's which was converted from a Kwik Save in 2007,  a Booth's which opened on Liverpool Road in the mid-1960s and moved to Millbrook Way in the 1990s and a Tesco, which opened January 2021 on land which was previously occupied by the government buildings on the corner of Cop Lane and Liverpool Road. There are three fish and chip shops.

Penwortham Leisure Centre is part of Penwortham Priory Academy. It includes a 25-metre indoor swimming pool, gym and squash courts which are open to the general public.

One of Lancashire's oldest charities, Galloway's Society for the Blind, established in 1867, has had its headquarters in Penwortham since 1950. The charity provides services to 6,500 blind and visually impaired people across Lancashire and beyond.

In March 2020 Liam Stemson and Ellis McKeown founded Penwortham's first craft gin distillery, Fairham Gin. The pair released their Signature Edition, Dry Lancashire Gin, in April 2021, followed by Ochre Edition in November 2021. In July 2021 the distillery partnered with the Ribble Rivers Trust so that every 70cl bottle of gin buys a tree sapling that is to be planted in the Lancashire area.

Transport

The town has excellent transport links across the River Ribble. Liverpool Road leads into Preston via the "New Penwortham Bridge" of 1915. Penwortham Cop Lane railway station was on the West Lancashire Railway between Preston and Southport, until the line closed in 1964. The cutting which carried the railway under Cop Lane has been widened and now carries the A59 Penwortham bypass, known as Golden Way, which leads directly into Preston via the "Preston Flyover", which is now the main crossing over the river.

Frequent bus routes serving Penwortham are provided by Preston Bus and Stagecoach and, until it ceased trading in October 2015, by John Fishwick & Sons. All services operate to and from Preston city centre.

Notable people
 Former footballer and now TV pundit Mark Lawrenson was born Preston but grew up in Penwortham.
 Former WWE wrestler Wade Barrett (real name Stu Bennett) grew up in Penwortham.
Jessica Taylor from pop group Liberty X lived in Penwortham.
 Former England international and Ashes-winning cricketer Andrew Flintoff is currently signed to the local cricket club.

Community events
Many events are run in Penwortham throughout the year to bring together the community and celebrate different occasions. The longest running event, Penwortham Gala, is held annually on Hurst Grange Park, starting with a procession of floats that are filled with children from local primary schools and community organisations. This is followed by entertainment, stalls and a funfair throughout the day and into the evening.
Penwortham Live had its second event after beginning in April 2013, as a festival of music, art, drama and poetry. Live entertainment was available over the weekend throughout many local businesses, predominantly on the main high street, Liverpool Road.
Penwortham Christmas market is an annual festive market located on Liverpool Road. This is a one-day event in December, offering craft stalls, gifts, food and drink and entertainment.

See also

Listed buildings in Penwortham
Scheduled monuments in Lancashire
Penwortham's Original - No.1 Fairham Gin

References

External links

Penwortham Town Council
Simple History of Penwortham

Towns in Lancashire
Geography of South Ribble
Civil parishes in Lancashire